was a Japanese television and film actor.

Biography
Yamashiro, who was originally from Kyoto, Japan, was born , but used Shingo Yamashiro as his stage name.  He made his film acting debut in 1957.

Yamashiro starred in the television series Hakuba Dōji ("White Horse Rider"), beginning in 1960. During the 1970s, Yamashiro appeared in several yakuza films such as the Battles Without Honor and Humanity series and Gambling Den Heist (1975). Yamashiro also directed occasionally, helming such films in Nikkatsu's Roman porno series as Female Cats (1983) and Gemini Woman (1984). He starred in several variety shows later in his career.

Later years
Yamashiro was admitted to a nursing home in Machida, western Tokyo, for treatment of diabetes. He died of pneumonia at said nursing home on August 12, 2009, at the age of 70.

Filmography

Films
13 Assassins (1963)
Kunoichi ninpō (1964)
 The Valiant Red Peony (1968)
Battles Without Honor and Humanity: Deadly Fight in Hiroshima (1973), Shoichi Eda
Battles Without Honor and Humanity: Proxy War (1973), Shoichi Eda
Battles Without Honor and Humanity: Police Tactics (1974), Shoichi Eda
Battles Without Honor and Humanity: Final Episode (1974), Shoichi Eda
New Battles Without Honor and Humanity (1974), Kenji Yamamori
The Homeless (1974)
Cross the Rubicon! (1975)
Cops vs. Thugs (1975)
Aftermath of Battles Without Honor and Humanity (1979)
Final Take (1986), Reikichi Toda
Hachiko Monogatari (1987)
Sweet Home (film) (1989)

Television
Key Hunter (1969)
G-Men '75 (1975)
Furuhata Ninzaburō (1996), Masao Nandaimon

References

External links

1938 births
2009 deaths
Male actors from Kyoto